Robert or Bob Manning may refer to:

Robert Manning (engineer) (1816–1897), Irish engineer
Robert Manning (journalist) (1919–2012), American journalist
Robert Manning (priest) (1655–1731), Roman Catholic priest
Robert D. Manning (born 1957), American economist
Robert Manning (politician) (1927–2006), member of the Ohio House of Representatives
Bob Manning (soul singer) (born 1945), American singer
Bob Manning (pop singer) (1926–1997), American singer popular in the 1950s
Bob Manning (musician), British musician
Bob Manning (mayor) (born 1945), mayor of the Cairns Regional Council, Queensland, Australia
Bobby Manning, a fictional character played by Rick Peters in the TV series Sue Thomas: F.B.Eye

See also
Robert Mannyng (1275–1338), also known as Robert de Brunne, English monk and chronicler, a pioneer of recording English oral history
Robert Manning Technology College, a secondary school in Bourne, Lincolnshire, named for the above listed pioneer, now known as Bourne Academy